Richard C. Muhlberger (born 1938 in New Jersey, United States died March 23, 2019) was an American art critic, and museum curator. He was Curator of Education for the Worcester Art Museum. He later became a professor of art history at Western New England College, and the vice-director for the Metropolitan Museum of Art, but he is best recognized for his analysis of many famous art pieces.

Career
Some of the most famous pieces Mühlberger has critiqued are done by Rembrandt, Leonardo da Vinci, and Pablo Picasso. Along with being a critic, Muhlberger was also a writer. He was known for a series containing critiques of illustrious authors. This series is made up of several books, "What makes a Rembrandt a Rembrandt?", "What makes a Van Gogh a Van Gogh?", "What makes a Monet a Monet?", "What makes a Degas a Degas?", "What makes a Cassatt a Cassatt?", "What makes a Goya a Goya?", "What makes a Bruegel a Bruegel?", What makes a Leonardo a Leonardo?", "What makes a Raphael a Raphael?", and "What makes a Picasso a Picasso?". More of his written works included a series titled "The Bible in Art". It contains the following books "Bible in Art: The Old Testament" and, "Bible in Art: The New Testament". Mühlberger's latest work was called "Charles Webster Hawthorne: Paintings drawings, and Watercolors".

Works

Death
Richard Muhlberger passed away in June age 2019, age 81

References

1938 births
Western New England University faculty
People associated with the Metropolitan Museum of Art
Living people
People associated with the Worcester Art Museum